Macaye is a commune in the Pyrénées-Atlantiques department in south-western France.

Population

Geography

Neighboring communes
 Hasparren to the north
 Cambo-les-Bains to the north-west
 Mendionde to the east
 Louhossoa to the west
 Bidarray to the south

See also
Communes of the Pyrénées-Atlantiques department

References

Communes of Pyrénées-Atlantiques
Pyrénées-Atlantiques communes articles needing translation from French Wikipedia